Commodore James Graham Goodenough  (3 December 1830 – 20 August 1875) was an officer in the Royal Navy who went on to become Commander-in-Chief, Australia Station.

Early life and family
He was born at Stoke Hill near Guildford in Surrey, the son of Edmund Goodenough, Dean of Wells Cathedral, and Frances Cockerell. His paternal grandfather was Samuel Goodenough, Bishop of Carlisle, and his godfather was Sir James Graham, after whom he was named. He was educated at Westminster School.

In 1864 he married Victoria Hamilton; they had two sons, including Admiral Sir William Edmund Goodenough.

Naval career
At 14 years of age Goodenough joined the Royal Navy. He firstly (1844–1848) served on HMS Collingwood under Captain Robert Smart in the Pacific fleet of Admiral Sir George Francis Seymour. He then joined HMS Cyclops off coast of Africa, before returning to England late in 1849 to sit his lieutenant's exam.

He went on to serve in the Second Opium War being present at the capture of Canton in 1857. Promoted to Captain in 1863, he was given command of HMS Victoria and then HMS Minotaur. He served as Commander-in-Chief, Australia Station, from 1873.

He died of tetanus aboard HMS Pearl off the coast of Australia, resulting from wounds inflicted from poisoned arrows in an attack by natives of the Santa Cruz Islands. He is buried in St Thomas's Church in North Sydney. Some sources state his burial location at St Leonards Cemetery in north Sydney.

Memorials
A stained glass window, Adoration of the Lamb, in St Thomas's Church in North Sydney, is dedicated in his memory and a bust, sculptured by Count Gleichen, was placed in the Painted Hall of Greenwich Hospital. A memorial was also constructed in North Sydney (St Thomas's Church?).

The church of the Holy Cross, Cromer Street, King's Cross, London was built in his memory in 1888.  The church bell is the ship's bell from HMS Pearl, his flagship

References

External links
 
 James Goodenough

1830 births
1875 deaths
Military personnel from Guildford
People educated at Westminster School, London
Royal Navy officers
Royal Navy personnel of the Second Opium War
Companions of the Order of the Bath
Companions of the Order of St Michael and St George
People from Guildford
19th-century Royal Navy personnel
James